Aglaia bourdillonii is a species of plant in the family Meliaceae. It is endemic to southern India.

References

bourdillonii
Flora of Kerala
Flora of Tamil Nadu
Vulnerable plants
Taxonomy articles created by Polbot